Planet was an early steam locomotive built in 1830 by Robert Stephenson and Company for the Liverpool and Manchester Railway.

History
The ninth locomotive built for the L&MR, it was Stephenson's next major design change after the Rocket. It was the first locomotive to employ inside cylinders, and subsequently the 2-2-0 type became known as Planets.

It only lasted in service about ten years; having been rebuilt in 1833, it was withdrawn circa 1840–1841.

Planet-type locomotives

Six further of the type were ordered by the L&MR from Robert Stephenson & Co. Three more were supplied by Murray & Wood in Leeds, to whom Robert Stephenson & Co. had sent the drawings for their manufacture.

The Planet (from 1830) and the Patentee (from 1834, also designed by Stephenson) were the first locomotive types to be built in large numbers.

Improvements 
The Planet locomotives appear closer to subsequent types, and conversely look quite different from Rocket although only a year separated these two designs (Stephenson's Northumbrian representing an intermediate evolutionary step).

Other improvements include:

 a steam dome to prevent water reaching the cylinders. 
 buffers and couplings in a position setting a new standard.

Replica 
A working replica was built in 1992 by the Friends of the Museum of Science and Industry (MOSI) in Manchester, and is operated by volunteers to provide rides for visitors. When not in steam the locomotive is on display in the museum's Power Hall. Planet has visited several other Heritage railways including Shildon Locomotion Museum.

The replica was used as an on-screen stand-in for itself in an episode of the ITV/PBS television series Victoria.

Later engines named Planet 
Planet having been retired before the London and North Western Railway acquired the Liverpool and Manchester Railway, the name was absent from the LNWR list until 1866 when Samson class 2-4-0 no. 935 was named Planet. The name (and number) were passed to that locomotive's replacement in 1893, a Waterloo class 2-4-0. That locomotive lasted until 1909, but then remained unused for four years until a George the Fifth class 4-4-0 no. 2197 received the name. This locomotive was withdrawn in 1935.

LMS Royal Scot Class 4-6-0 locomotive 6131 was originally named Planet when built in 1928, but in 1936 was renamed The Royal Warwickshire Regiment.  In 1948, the name was applied to LMS Rebuilt Patriot Class No. 45545. British Railways Class 86 86218 carried the name Planet from 1979 to 1993.

See also 
 List of Liverpool and Manchester Railway locomotives

References

Further reading

External links 
 
 "Planet Type 2-2-0" on VictorianWeb

Liverpool and Manchester Railway locomotives
2-2-0 locomotives
Steam locomotive types
Early steam locomotives
Individual locomotives of Great Britain
Standard gauge steam locomotives of Great Britain
Scrapped locomotives